Francisco da Silva is the name of:

 Francisco da Silva (politician) (1957–2010), president of the National Assembly of São Tomé and Príncipe
 Francisco da Silva (fencer) (born 1945), Portuguese Olympic fencer